Ma. Dolzura Cortez (died 1992) was the first Filipino AIDS victim who came out in the open to tell about her life and how she acquired the AIDS virus.

Her life story was made into the 1993 Filipino film Dahil Mahal Kita (English "Because I Love You: The Dolzura Cortez Story"), directed by Laurice Guillen, screenplay by Ricardo Lee, starring Vilma Santos, Christopher de Leon, Charito Solis, Maila Gumila, Mikee Villanueva and Jackie Aquino.

This Philippine drama chronicles the colorful life of Dolzura Cortez, the first publicly recognized AIDS patient in the Philippines. The film begins with a brief examination of Cortez’s pre-AIDS life. Initially she lived in a small village with her cruel husband and three kids. The spunky woman leaves them and moves to the big city where she engages in several affairs. Her second marriage to a rich foreigner does not last long. To support her children, Dolly begins an all woman “contract worker” agency. This also serves to facilitate her love of night-life. Tragedy comes to Dolzura after she collapses on a dance floor one night and learns that she has AIDS. At a Manila hospital she meets ex-lover Paulo, an AIDS researcher who encourages to tell her story publicly. The courageous woman does and she becomes instrumental in spreading AIDS awareness to the islands. It was the first film on AIDS in the Philippines that provided ‘a name and a face’ among the 50 recorded lives that were lost to AIDS in 1992. The film was utilized as a focus of discussion by some health care personnel to express their thoughts, opinions and recommendations regarding the use of cinema as a powerful tool for AIDS information dissemination.

References

External links
 IMDB listing for Dahil Mahal Kita
 United Nations Development Programme review of Dahil Mahal Kita

1992 deaths
People from Manila
AIDS-related deaths in the Philippines
Year of birth missing